Campichthys tricarinatus (three-keel pipefish) is a species of marine fish of the family Syngnathidae. It is found in the western central Pacific Ocean, from Montebello Island (Western Australia) to Cape York (Queensland), and specimens have been recorded around the Northern Mariana and Marshall Islands. This species is ovoviviparous, with males carrying eggs in a brood pouch until giving birth to live young.

References

Further reading

Australian Government Department of the Environment and Energy

tricarinatus
Marine fish
Fish described in 1977